Leidyula is a genus of slugs in the family Veronicellidae, the leatherleaf slugs.

Species 
Species include:
 Leidyula floridana (Leidy, 1851) – Florida leatherleaf slug
Leidyula kraussi – dappled leatherleaf
 Leidyula moreleti (Fischer, 1871) – tan leatherleaf
Leidyula sloani – sloan leatherleaf

References 

Veronicellidae